Evershot was a railway station in the county of Dorset in England. Served by trains on what is now known as the Heart of Wessex Line, it was two miles from the village it served, at Holywell, just south of Evershot Tunnel. The station consisted of two platforms, a small goods yard and signal box. It had a station building on the up platform.

History

Opened on 20 January 1857 by the Wilts, Somerset and Weymouth Railway, it became part of the Great Western Railway. Remaining in that company in the grouping of 1923, it was placed in the Western Region when the railways were nationalised in 1948. The station closed when local trains were withdrawn during the Beeching closures, taking effect on 3 October 1966.

Accident

An accident which resulted in the death of a railway staff member took place near this station in 1865.

The site today
Some remains of the station can be seen in the wide area it occupied just south of the tunnel.

References

External links
 Station on navigable O.S. map

Disused railway stations in Dorset
Former Great Western Railway stations
Railway stations in Great Britain opened in 1857
Railway stations in Great Britain closed in 1966
Beeching closures in England
1857 establishments in England